The Price of Living (Spanish: El valor de vivir) is a 1954 Mexican drama film directed by Tito Davison and starring Arturo de Córdova, Rosita Quintana and María Douglas. It was the first Mexican film to be shot in 3D.

The film's sets were designed by the art director Gunther Gerszo.

Cast
 Arturo de Córdova
 Rosita Quintana
 María Douglas
 Julio Villarreal
 Miguel Ángel Ferriz
 José Baviera
 José María Linares-Rivas
 Delia Magaña
 Otilia Larrañaga
 Gilberto González
 Nicolás Rodríguez
 Eva Beltri
 Fernando Wagner
 Miguel Manzano
 José Silva
 Ricardo Silva
 Queta Lavat
 Agustín Fernández
 Antonio Bravo
 Guillermo Álvarez Bianchi
 José Pardavé
 Enrique García Álvarez
 Mercedes Pascual

References

Bibliography 
 Baugh, Scott L. Latino American Cinema: An Encyclopedia of Movies, Stars, Concepts, and Trends. ABC-CLIO, 2012.

External links 
 

1954 films
1954 drama films
Mexican drama films
1950s Spanish-language films
Films directed by Tito Davison
Columbia Pictures films
Mexican black-and-white films
1950s Mexican films